Lieutenant-General Sir Samuel Robert Wesley  ( – 5 January 1877) was an Anglo-Irish Royal Marines officer who served as Deputy Adjutant-General Royal Marines.

Early life
Wesley was the son Robert Wesley and Ellen Butt of Lismoat or Lismote Castle, County Limerick, Kingdom of Ireland, where he was born around 1791.

Military career
Wesley was commissioned into the Royal Marine Artillery. He saw action in Spain during the First Carlist War before becoming Assistant Adjutant-General at Headquarters Royal Marine Forces. He became Deputy Adjutant-General Royal Marines (the professional head of the Royal Marines) in December 1854 and directed the involvement of the Royal Marines during the Crimean War before retiring in January 1862.

References

 

 

1790s births
1877 deaths
Military personnel from County Limerick
Royal Marines generals
Knights Commander of the Order of the Bath
Military personnel of the First Carlist War
British military personnel of the Crimean War